Péter Czégai (born 20 July 1976) is a Hungarian sailor. He competed in the men's 470 event at the 2004 Summer Olympics.

References

External links
 

1976 births
Living people
Hungarian male sailors (sport)
Olympic sailors of Hungary
Sailors at the 2004 Summer Olympics – 470
People from Veszprém
Sportspeople from Veszprém County